Sanghi Temple, which is said to be the replica of Tirumala temple is located at Sanghi Nagar in Telangana in India, is about 35 km from Hyderabad city.

The sacred Raja Gopuram, which is very tall, can be seen from  several kilometers away.

The temple is located on the top of Paramanand Giri hill, which attracts a number of devotees.

The temple is managed by Mrs Anita Sanghi of the Sanghi Family.

References 

Hindu temples in Hyderabad, India
Hindu temples in Telangana
Vishnu temples